The 1903 municipal election was held December 14, 1903 for the purpose of electing a mayor and three aldermen to sit on the Edmonton Town Council, as well as five public school trustees and five separate school trustees.  There were six aldermanic positions on the council at the time, but three of them were already filled:  Arthur Cushing, Daniel Fraser, and James Ross had been elected for two-year terms in 1902, and were still in office.

The 1903 election was the last to occur while Edmonton was still a town; the following year, it was incorporated as a city.

Voter turnout

Voter turnout figures for the 1903 municipal election are no longer available.

Results

(bold indicates elected, italics indicate incumbent)

Mayor

William Short - 277
Hedley C. Taylor - 246

Aldermen

 Charles May - 421
 Edmund Grierson - 282
 Joseph Henri Picard - 171
 William Antrobus Griesbach - 126
 Cornelius Gallagher - 122
 W J Bourchier - 108
 Samuel C Paton - 100
 W H Heathcoate - 39
 W J Webster - 31

Public school trustees

Arthur Cushing, Robert Lee, Kenneth McLeod, Alex Taylor, and Hedley C. Taylor were elected.  Detailed results are no longer available.

Separate (Catholic) school trustees

Nicolas Dubois Dominic Beck, H Morel, Joseph Henri Picard, J Pomerleau, and Antonio Prince were elected.  Detailed results are no longer available.

References

City of Edmonton: Edmonton Elections

1903
1903 elections in Canada
1903 in Alberta